Aviation-related lists